Simon Gefvert (born 28 March 1997) is a Swedish football midfielder who plays for Västerås.

Club career
On 29 March 2021, Gefvert signed a two-season contract with Västerås.

References

1997 births
Living people
Swedish footballers
Association football midfielders
Karlslunds IF players
IK Sirius Fotboll players
Västerås SK Fotboll players
Ettan Fotboll players
Allsvenskan players
Superettan players